The House of Bogdan, commonly referred to as the House of Mușat, was the ruling family which established the Principality of Moldova with Bogdan I  ( 1363–1367), giving the country its first line of Princes, one closely related with the Basarab rulers of Wallachia by several marriages through time. The Mușatins are named after Margareta Mușata who married Costea, a son of Bogdan I. For a long time it has been thought that Mușata was a daughter of Bogdan I and Costea was a member of House of Basarab who bore the name Muşat, all speculations unsupported by any documents.

The word mușat, which gives the dynasty its name, means handsome in old Romanian.

Genealogy

Recent studies, based on the careful consideration of existing documents and a recently discovered chronicle of Moldavia in Poland, managed to establish the most likely link between Bogdan I and his successors from the so-called house of Mușat, as well as the succession line and ruling periods of each prince from the 14th century.

The following genealogical tree is an oversimplified version, meant to show only the ruling princes, their documented brothers and sisters, and the spouses/extramarital liaisons of those who had ruling heirs, following the conventions:

 Ruling princes have their name emphasized and their ruling years in Moldavia.
 Several members of House of Musat ruled in Wallachia; those reigning years are marked with W.
 If the prince died while ruling, the last year is preceded by a cross.
 Small numbers at the end of each name are meant to indicate the mother of each offspring.
 No number when the father had several spouses or extramarital affairs, means the mother is unknown.
 Spouses and extramarital liaisons are separated by a horizontal line.
Indeterminate or illegitimate descent are presented with dashed vertical lines.

See also 
 Bogdana Monastery

References

External links 
  (partial genealogy)

 
Romanian noble families
Rulers of Moldavia
Romanian royal houses